Brampton Excelsiors may refer to:

Brampton Excelsiors (MSL), a box lacrosse team from Brampton, Ontario, Canada, who compete in the Major Series Lacrosse Senior "A" Lacrosse League
Brampton Excelsiors Jr. A, a box lacrosse team from Brampton, Ontario, Canada, who compete in the OLA Junior A Lacrosse League
Brampton Excelsiors, now Mississauga Tomahawks Jr. B, a box lacrosse team from Mississauga, Ontario, Canada.  who compete in the OLA Junior B Lacrosse League